Jakob Bernhard Christian Jensen (February 16, 1912 – June 17, 1997) was a Danish flatwater canoeist who competed in the late 1940s. He won a silver in the K-2 1000 m event at the 1948 Summer Olympics in London.

Jensen also won two bronze medals at the 1948 ICF Canoe Sprint World Championships in London, earning them in the K-1 4 x 500 m and the K-2 500 m events.

References

1912 births
1997 deaths
Canoeists at the 1948 Summer Olympics
Danish male canoeists
Olympic canoeists of Denmark
Olympic silver medalists for Denmark
Olympic medalists in canoeing
ICF Canoe Sprint World Championships medalists in kayak

Medalists at the 1948 Summer Olympics